The city of Abaetetuba is located in Pará State, Brazil. The population of the municipality is 159,080 (IBGE figure 2020). The city is the seat of the Roman Catholic Diocese of Abaetetuba, and home of the Our Lady of the Conception Cathedral.

Etymology 
"Abaetetuba" comes from the Tupi language and means "group of true men", from the words abá ("man"), eté ("true") and tyba ("group").

History 

First settlements in the region date to 1635, when capuchin friars originating in the convent of Una in Belém joined a village of nomadic indigenous tribes in a settlement with the name of Samaúma, though later baptized as the district of Beja by governor Francisco Xavier de Mendonça Furtado.

Later, in 1724, Francisco de Azevedo Monteiro, dedicated to the exploration of local amazonian spices and goods, acquired a Sesmaria in the region, founding a settlement on the shores of the river Maratauíra in a location protected from the tides by the island of Sirituba, which would later form the urban center of the current city.

Known then as Abaeté, the settlement was granted the status of autonomous municipality and separated from the capital of Belem in 1880 through law nº 973, Abaeté would later be granted the status of city in 1895 through state law nº 324 and finally change its name to Abaetetuba in December 30th of 1943, through decree-law nº 4.505.

References

 
Municipalities in Pará